Xaviera Hollander (born 15 June 1943) is a Dutch former call girl, madam and author. She is best known for her best-selling memoir The Happy Hooker: My Own Story.

Early life
Hollander was born Xaviera "Vera" de Vries in Surabaya, Japanese-occupied Dutch East Indies, which later became part of present-day Indonesia, to a Dutch Jewish physician father and a mother of French and German descent. She spent the first years of her life in a Japanese-run internment camp.

In her early 20s she left Amsterdam for Johannesburg, where her stepsister lived. There she met and became engaged to American economist John Weber. When the engagement was broken off, she left South Africa for New York City.

Career
In 1968 she resigned from her job as a secretary in the Dutch consulate in Manhattan to become a call girl, making $1,000 a night ($ today). A year later, she opened her own brothel, the Vertical Whorehouse, and soon became New York City's leading madam. In 1971, she was arrested for prostitution by New York Police and forced to leave the United States.

Author
In 1971, Hollander published a memoir, The Happy Hooker: My Own Story. Robin Moore, who took Hollander's dictation of the book's contents, came up with the title, while Yvonne Dunleavy ghostwrote it. Hollander later wrote a number of other books and produced plays in Amsterdam. Her second book, Child No More, is the story of losing her mother. For 35 years she wrote an advice column for Penthouse magazine, entitled "Call Me Madam."

Other ventures

In the early 1970s, she recorded a primarily spoken-word album titled Xaviera! for the Canadian GRT Records label (GRT 9230-1033), on which she discussed her philosophy regarding sex and prostitution, sang a cover version of the Beatles' song "Michelle", and recorded several simulated sexual encounters, including an example of phone sex, a threesome and a celebrity encounter with guest "vocal" by Ronnie Hawkins. Xaviera's Game, an erotic board game, was released in 1974 by Reiss Games, Inc. In 1975, she starred in the semi-autobiographical film My Pleasure is My Business. Beginning in 2005, she operated Xaviera's Happy House, a bed and breakfast within her Amsterdam home.

Personal life
For several years in the 1970s, Hollander lived in Toronto, where she married Frank Applebaum, a Canadian antique dealer, and was a regular fixture in the downtown scene. She mentions a lover named John Drummond, with whom she partnered for many years, co-authoring two books, including Let's Get Moving (1988) about their life together: "I went there with, what for years had been the love of my life, John Drummond, a wild Scottish intellectual who, at times, liked his whisky, beer and wines too much. We had great sex, often up to 3 times a day—all that and he was about 17 years older than me". During a 2018 interview, she revealed a darker side in the relationship with a man she called "the love of my life!": "The love of my life 25 years ago, John Drummond, a brilliant and boisterous Scotsman with a 'Thatcheresque' accent had, especially under the influence of a few scotches, beers, or wine, become quite destructive towards me. He is the only one who managed to deprive me of my self-esteem or identity, temporarily.  He used to say that a British man’s way of saying 'I love you' is to put his woman down." Drummond is listed as one of her husbands. Hollander claimed to have "turned gay" around 1997, establishing a long-term relationship with a Dutch poet called Dia. In January 2007, she married a Dutch man, Philip de Haan, in Amsterdam.

Other works
Hollander has been depicted in film five times:
 The Life and Times of Xaviera Hollander (1974, rated X) – Samantha McLaren
 The Best Part of a Man (1975) – Artistae Stiftung
 The Happy Hooker (1975) – Lynn Redgrave
 The Happy Hooker Goes to Washington (1977) – Joey Heatherton
 The Happy Hooker Goes Hollywood (1980) – Martine Beswick

She appears in at least two films:
 My Pleasure Is My Business (1975, Al Waxman) as Gabrielle
 Xaviera Hollander, the Happy Hooker: Portrait of a Sexual Revolutionary, a 2008 documentary directed, jointly produced, photographed and edited by Robert Dunlap. In addition, Hollander made additional contributions to the script.

In 1989, Hollander made an extended appearance on British discussion programme After Dark, alongside Mary Stott, Malcolm Bennett and Hans Eysenck, among others.

A musical about her life was written and composed by Richard Hansom and Warren Wills.

Books

Non-fiction 
  Moore took Hollander's dictation, and Dunleavy transcribed the results.

Fiction
 
 
 
 Co-written with John Drummond: 
 
 The Golden Phallus of Osiris Trilogy:
 
 
 
 Co-written with John Drummond:

See also
 Polly Adler

References

External links
 
 

1943 births
Living people
20th-century Dutch East Indies people
20th-century Dutch women writers
21st-century Dutch women writers
Bisexual women
Bisexual memoirists
Dutch columnists
Dutch erotica writers
Dutch expatriates in Canada
Dutch expatriates in South Africa
Dutch expatriates in the United States
Dutch memoirists
Dutch people of French descent
Dutch people of German descent
Dutch people of Jewish descent
Dutch brothel owners and madams
Dutch prostitutes
Dutch bisexual people
Dutch LGBT writers
Penthouse (magazine) people
People from Surabaya
Prostitution in New York (state)
Sex positivism
Dutch sex columnists
Dutch women columnists
Women erotica writers
Women memoirists
World War II civilian prisoners held by Japan
Writers from Amsterdam